White Hills may refer to one of the following:
White Hills, Arizona, a ghost town in the White Hills of Arizona
White Hills (Arizona), a range of hills in Mohave County, Arizona
White Hills, Northamptonshire, United Kingdom
White Hills (Shelton), Connecticut, United States
White Hills (Inyo County), California, United States
White Hills (Santa Barbara County), California, United States
White Hills (Idaho), Idaho, United States
White Hills, Tasmania, a locality in Australia
White Hills, Victoria, Australia
Whitehills, Aberdeenshire, Scotland, United Kingdom
White Hill (Nova Scotia), Canada
White Hills (band), an American space rock band

See also 
White Hill (disambiguation)
White Mountains (disambiguation)